Wilhelm Hennis (18 February 1923 – 10 November 2012) was a German political scientist.

Hennis was born in Hildesheim.  In 1960, he became professor at the Pedagogical College of Hannover. In 1962, he became a Professor in Hamburg, and in 1967 at Albert Ludwigs University of Freiburg, where until his death he was a professor emeritus.  He died, aged 89, in Freiburg im Breisgau.

External links
 Wilhelm Hennis on the German National Library
 University of Freiburg: Prof. em. Dr. Dr. h. c. Wilhelm Hennis (Biography in German)
 Biography (in German)
 Hennis' article in the German weekly DIE ZEIT, asking readers to join him in complaining to the General State Prosecutor in Cologne about the deletion of files allegedly containing information about fishy affairs concerning the privatisation of formerly state owned companies in Eastern Germany by the conservative government led by Helmut Kohl when handing over their offices to the new government of social democrats and greens

1923 births
2012 deaths
German political scientists
People from Hildesheim
People from the Province of Hanover
Commanders Crosses of the Order of Merit of the Federal Republic of Germany